Rosyth is one of the 22 wards used to elect members of the Fife council. It elects three Councillors.

Councillors

Election Results

2022 Election
2022 Fife Council election

2019 By-election
On 13 September 2019 Rosyth SNP Councillor Samantha Steele resigned her seat citing health reasons and family problems. A by-election was held on 14 November 2019 and Sharon Green-Wilson held the seat for the SNP.

2017 Election
2017 Fife Council election

2015 By-election
A by-election was held after Douglas Chapman resigned, having been elected MP for Dunfermline and West Fife

2012 Election
2012 Fife Council election

2007 Election
2007 Fife Council election

References

Wards of Fife
Rosyth